"Hey Everybody!" is a song by Australian pop rock band 5 Seconds of Summer. The song is the second single from the band's second album Sounds Good Feels Good. The song contains elements from "Hungry Like the Wolf" by Duran Duran, who were given a writing credit on the song.

Promotion
The band performed the track on Alan Carr: Chatty Man Stand Up to Cancer special, broadcast on 26 October 2015, and TFI Friday on 6 November 2015. It was later performed at the American Music Awards, on The Ellen DeGeneres Show, BBC Radio 1's Live Lounge, Sirius XM Radio, at the Radio 1 Teen Awards, on On Air with Ryan Seacrest, Elvis Duran and The Late Late Show with James Corden.

Music video
The video directed by Isaac Rentz, shot in Los Angeles, California begins with the band members working menial jobs, Calum as a dog walker, Ashton as a dino suit wearing birthday party entertainer, Michael as a street mascot promoting hot dogs and Luke as a mercilessly abused office desk drone. Fantasy sequences depict goofing off at a palatial Pasadena mansion with middle-aged men as bagpipers, scenes of Mexican-style wrestling, polo players on segways, water sliding in body taping, throwing money around and camera mugging dressed like hustler/pimp/gangsta-rappers, hunting Ashton in animal suits through a low-cut hedgemaze, ending with Ashton beaten with pool noodles. Ashton throws the birthday cake on the ground, then the band member soak in a hot tub with one of the wrestlers, ignoring the mega-sized pizza that has just been ordered, and then they all jump in the pool. A narrator announces the fate of each band member.

Track listing
Digital download
"Hey Everybody!" – 3:16

German CD single
"Hey Everybody" 
"Over and Out" – 2:59

Personnel
Luke Hemmings – lead and backing vocals, rhythm guitar
Michael Clifford – lead and backing vocals, lead guitar
Calum Hood – backing vocals, bass guitar
Ashton Irwin – backing vocals, drums

Charts

References

2015 singles
2015 songs
5 Seconds of Summer songs
Capitol Records singles
Song recordings produced by John Feldmann
Song recordings produced by the Monsters & Strangerz
Songs written by Calum Hood